The rusty-breasted wren-babbler (Gypsophila rufipectus) is a species of bird in the family Pellorneidae.
It is endemic to western Sumatra in Indonesia.

Its natural habitats are subtropical or tropical moist lowland forest and subtropical or tropical moist montane forest.

References

Collar, N. J. & Robson, C. 2007. Family Timaliidae (Babblers)  pp. 70 – 291 in; del Hoyo, J., Elliott, A. & Christie, D.A. eds. Handbook of the Birds of the World, Vol. 12. Picathartes to Tits and Chickadees. Lynx Edicions, Barcelona.

rusty-breasted wren-babbler
Birds of Sumatra
rusty-breasted wren-babbler
Taxonomy articles created by Polbot
Taxobox binomials not recognized by IUCN